WGMK (106.3 FM) is a radio station broadcasting a classic rock format. Licensed to Donalsonville, Georgia, United States, the station is currently owned by Flint Media, Inc. and features programming from ABC Radio .

Previous logo
 (WGMK's previous "Oldies 106.3" logo)

References

External links

GMK